The following outline is provided as an overview of and topical guide to Uganda:

Uganda –commonly referred to as the Pearl by Churchill is a land-locked sovereign country located in East Africa, bordered on the east by Kenya, the north by South Sudan, on the west by the Democratic Republic of the Congo, on the southwest by Rwanda, and on the south by Tanzania.  The southern part of the country includes a substantial portion of Lake Victoria, within which it shares borders with Kenya and Tanzania. Uganda takes its name from the Buganda kingdom, which encompassed a portion of the south of the country including the capital Kampala.

General reference 

 Pronunciation:  or 
 Common English country name:  Uganda
 Official English country name:  The Republic of Uganda
 Common endonym(s):  
 Official endonym(s):  
 Adjectival(s): Ugandan
 Demonym(s):
 International rankings of Uganda
 ISO country codes:  UG, UGA, 800
 ISO region codes:  See ISO 3166-2:UG
 Internet country code top-level domain:  .ug

Geography of Uganda 

 Uganda is: a landlocked country
 Location:
 Eastern Hemisphere, on the Equator
 Africa
 East Africa
 Time zone:  East Africa Time (UTC+03)
 Extreme points of Uganda
 High:  Margherita Peak 
 Low:  Albert Nile 
 Land boundaries:  2,698 km
 933 km
 765 km
 435 km
 396 km
 169 km
 Coastline:  none
 Population of Uganda: 42,884,000  - 32nd most populous country

 Area of Uganda: 236,040 km2
 Atlas of Uganda

Environment of Uganda 

 Climate of Uganda
 Ecoregions in Uganda
 Protected areas of Uganda
 National parks of Uganda
 Wildlife of Uganda
 Fauna of Uganda
 Birds of Uganda
 Mammals of Uganda

Natural geographic features of Uganda 

 Glaciers of Uganda (in the Rwenzori Mountains)
 Glacial recession in the Rwenzori Mountains
 Lakes of Uganda
 Mountains of Uganda
 Volcanoes in Uganda
 Rivers of Uganda
 World Heritage Sites in Uganda

Regions of Uganda 

Regions of Uganda

Ecoregions of Uganda 

List of ecoregions in Uganda
 Ecoregions in Uganda

Administrative divisions of Uganda 

Administrative divisions of Uganda
 Districts of Uganda
 Counties of Uganda
 Sub-counties of Uganda

Districts of Uganda 

Districts of Uganda
Uganda is divided into 80 districts across four administrative regions.

Counties of Uganda 

Counties of Uganda
The districts of Uganda are divided into 146 counties, one city council, and thirteen municipalities.

Sub-counties of Uganda 

The counties of Uganda are divided into sub-counties, which are further divided into parishes and villages.

Demography of Uganda 

Demographics of Uganda

Government and politics of Uganda 

Politics of Uganda
 Form of government: presidential republic
 Capital of Uganda: Kampala
 Elections in Uganda
 Political parties in Uganda

Branches of the government of Uganda 

Government of Uganda

Executive branch of the government of Uganda 
 Head of state and head of government: President of Uganda, Yoweri Museveni
 Prime Minister of Uganda, Amama Mbabazi - assists the president in the supervision of the cabinet
 Cabinet of Uganda

Legislative branch of the government of Uganda 

 National Assembly of Uganda (unicameral)

Judicial branch of the government of Uganda 

Judiciary of Uganda
 Supreme Court of Uganda

Foreign relations of Uganda 

Foreign relations of Uganda
 Diplomatic missions in Uganda
 Diplomatic missions of Uganda

International organization membership 
The Republic of Uganda is a member of:

African, Caribbean, and Pacific Group of States (ACP)
African Development Bank Group (AfDB)
African Union/United Nations Hybrid operation in Darfur (UNAMID)
African Union (AU)
Common Market for Eastern and Southern Africa (COMESA)
Commonwealth of Nations
East African Community (EAC)
East African Development Bank (EADB)
Food and Agriculture Organization (FAO)
Group of 77 (G77)
Inter-Governmental Authority on Development (IGAD)
International Atomic Energy Agency (IAEA)
International Bank for Reconstruction and Development (IBRD)
International Civil Aviation Organization (ICAO)
International Criminal Court (ICCt)
International Criminal Police Organization (Interpol)
International Development Association (IDA)
International Federation of Red Cross and Red Crescent Societies (IFRCS)
International Finance Corporation (IFC)
International Fund for Agricultural Development (IFAD)
International Labour Organization (ILO)
International Monetary Fund (IMF)
International Olympic Committee (IOC)
International Organization for Migration (IOM)
International Organization for Standardization (ISO) (correspondent)
International Red Cross and Red Crescent Movement (ICRM)

International Telecommunication Union (ITU)
International Telecommunications Satellite Organization (ITSO)
International Trade Union Confederation (ITUC)
Inter-Parliamentary Union (IPU)
Islamic Development Bank (IDB)
Multilateral Investment Guarantee Agency (MIGA)
Nonaligned Movement (NAM)
Organisation of Islamic Cooperation (OIC)
Organisation for the Prohibition of Chemical Weapons (OPCW)
Permanent Court of Arbitration (PCA)
United Nations (UN)
United Nations Conference on Trade and Development (UNCTAD)
United Nations Educational, Scientific, and Cultural Organization (UNESCO)
United Nations High Commissioner for Refugees (UNHCR)
United Nations Industrial Development Organization (UNIDO)
United Nations Mission in the Central African Republic and Chad (MINURCAT)
United Nations Mission in the Sudan (UNMIS)
United Nations Operation in Cote d'Ivoire (UNOCI)
Universal Postal Union (UPU)
World Customs Organization (WCO)
World Federation of Trade Unions (WFTU)
World Health Organization (WHO)
World Intellectual Property Organization (WIPO)
World Meteorological Organization (WMO)
World Tourism Organization (UNWTO)
World Trade Organization (WTO)

Law and order in Uganda 

Law of Uganda
 Constitution of Uganda
 Human rights in Uganda
 LGBT rights in Uganda
 Law enforcement in Uganda

Military of Uganda 

Military of Uganda
 Command
 Commander-in-chief:
 Ministry of Defence of Uganda
 Forces
 Army of Uganda
 Navy of Uganda
 Air Force of Uganda
 Military history of Uganda

Local government in Uganda 

Uganda Local Governments Association

History of Uganda

History of Uganda by period 
Early history 
Protectorate (1894 to 1962)
1962 to 1963
1963 to 1971
Second Republic of Uganda (1971 to 1979)
1979 to 1986

History of Uganda by region 
History of Buganda

History of Uganda by topic 
 Military history of Uganda
 Postage stamps and postal history of Uganda

Culture of Uganda 

Culture of Uganda
 Cuisine of Uganda
 Languages of Uganda
 Media in Uganda
 Newspapers of Uganda
256News.com
East African Business Week
The Red Pepper
The Monitor
The New Vision
The Weekly Observer
Nile Chronicles
 Magazines in Uganda
The Independent - Uganda
African Woman
PC Tech Magazine
 National symbols of Uganda
 Coat of arms of Uganda
 Flag of Uganda
 National anthem of Uganda
 People of Uganda
 Prostitution in Uganda
 Public holidays in Uganda
 Religion in Uganda
 Hinduism in Uganda
 Islam in Uganda
 Judaism in Uganda
 World Heritage Sites in Uganda

Art in Uganda 
 Cinema of Uganda
 Music of Uganda

Sports in Uganda 

Sports in Uganda
 Football in Uganda
 Uganda at the Olympics

Economy and infrastructure of Uganda 

Economy of Uganda
 Economic rank, by nominal GDP (2007): 109th (one hundred and ninth)
 Agriculture in Uganda
 Banking in Uganda
 Communications in Uganda
 Internet in Uganda
 Companies of Uganda
 Uganda Investment Authority
Currency of Uganda: Shilling
ISO 4217: UGX
 Energy in Uganda
 Health care in Uganda
 Mining in Uganda
 Uganda Securities Exchange
 Tourism in Uganda
 Transport in Uganda
 Airports in Uganda
 Rail transport in Uganda
 Water supply and sanitation in Uganda

Education in Uganda 

Education in Uganda

Health in Uganda 

Health in Uganda

See also 

Uganda
Index of Uganda-related articles
List of international rankings
List of Uganda-related topics
Member state of the Commonwealth of Nations
Member state of the United Nations
Outline of Africa

References

External links 

Uganda. The World Factbook. Central Intelligence Agency.

US State Department - Uganda includes Background Notes, Country Study and major reports

Uganda Tourism Board

Uganda
 1